South Oakleigh College is a Victorian state co-educational secondary college serving Oakleigh and surrounding districts within the City of Monash in south eastern Melbourne, Australia. It is located on Bakers Road, near the intersection of Centre and Warrigal Roads, in Oakleigh South.

History 
South Oakleigh College was established and developed in the 2000s.

The principal is Helen Koziaris; former principal Deborah Locco was killed in a cycling accident in May 2020.

Facilities 
Among the college's facilities are a library, science and technology facilities including networked computer labs and food technology facilities, a 350-seat performing arts theatre, a television studio, a gymnasium and a fitness centre.

Curriculum

Subjects 
South Oakleigh Secondary College offers core strengthening subjects from Years 7–9. From Year 10, students are given the opportunity to study VCE subjects ahead of time, alongside their core subjects (English, Maths, Science and Humanities). In Year 11, students are also given the opportunity to complete Units 3 and 4 subjects, thus reducing the number of subjects they must study in Year 12. The subjects offered are:

Languages 
Year 7 students are required to learn a foreign language; the college offers Japanese and Greek.

VET subjects offered 
 Interactive Digital Media (VCE VET)
 Music: Technical Production (VCE VET)
 Hairdressing Certificate 2
 Retail Makeup & Skin Care Certificate 2

References

External links 
 

Public high schools in Melbourne
Buildings and structures in the City of Monash